The following is a list of notable events and releases of the year 2017 in Icelandic music.

Events

January

February 
 25 – The first Semi-final of the Söngvakeppnin, Eurovishen Song contest of Iceland.

March
 4 – The second Semi-final of the Söngvakeppnin, Eurovishen Song contest of Iceland.
 11
 The final of the 2017 Söngvakeppnin competition takes place in Iceland.
 Svala Björgvinsdóttir is selected as Iceland's representative in the Eurovision Song Contest 2017.

April
 13 – The Aldrei fór ég suður festival start in Ísafjörður (March 13 – 16).

May

June 
 16 – The Secret Solstice festival started in Reykjavík (June 16 – 18).

July 
 5 – The 18th Folk music festival of Siglufjordur start in Siglufjordur (July 5 – 9).

August
 2
 Björk announces her then-unnamed new album Utopia on social media. In an interview with Dazed and Confused magazine, she states that It’s about that search (for utopia) – and about being in love. Spending time with a person you enjoy is when the dream becomes real.

September

October

November 
 1 – The Iceland Airwaves festival start in Reykjavík (November 1 – 5).
 24 – Björk will release her ninth album Utopia.

December

Albums released

January

May

July

November

Deaths

February
 27 - Jórunn Viðar, Icelandic pianist and composer (born 1918).

See also 
 2017 in Iceland
 Music of Iceland
 Iceland in the Eurovision Song Contest 2017

References

Icelandic music
Icelandic
2017 in Iceland